Two-time defending champion Ilie Năstase successfully defended his title, defeating Tom Okker in the final, 6–3, 7–5, 4–6, 6–3 to win the singles title at the 1973 Commercial Union Assurance Masters.

Draw

Finals

Blue group
 Standings are determined by: 1. number of wins; 2. number of matches; 3. in two-players-ties, head-to-head records; 4. in three-players-ties, percentage of sets won, or of games won; 5. steering-committee decision.

White group
 Standings are determined by: 1. number of wins; 2. number of matches; 3. in two-players-ties, head-to-head records; 4. in three-players-ties, percentage of sets won, or of games won; 5. steering-committee decision.

See also
ATP World Tour Finals appearances

References

External links
 1973 Masters draw (ITF)

Singles

es:Masters 1972